The girls' doubles of the tournament 2009 BWF World Junior Championships was held on 28 October–1 November 2009. The Chinese pair of Tang Jinhua and Xia Huan took out the girls' doubles final defeating Indonesian pair, Suci Rizki Andini and Tiara Rosalia Nuraidah in three sets.

Seeds

  Tang Jinhua / Xia Huan (champion)
  Bao Yixin / Luo Yu (quarter-final)
  Poon Lok Yan / Tse Ying Suet (semi-final)
  Rodjana Chuthabunditkul / Sapsiree Taerattanachai (semi-final)
  Nguyen Thi Sen / Vu Thi Trang (quarter-final)
  Lai Pei Jing / Ng Hui Ern (quarter-final)
  Anastasia Chervaykova / Natalia Perminova (second round)
  Selena Piek / Iris Tabeling (second round)

Draw

Finals

Top-half

Section 1

Section 2

Bottom half

Section 3

Section 4

References

2009 BWF World Junior Championships